Grave worshipper or its Arabic equivalent quburiyyun, is a slur that is leveled primarily against Sufis. It is a term that is widely used among traditionalist Muslims or Salafis who interchange the term with innovator, or a practitioner of bidʻah.

See also
Zindiq

References

Islam-related slurs
Anti-Sufism